Charlie Hardy (November 7, 1933 – May 9, 2001) was a gridiron football end who played in the American Football League. He played college football at San Jose State.

Early life in high school
Hardy was born in Monroe, Louisiana, but grew up in Oakland, California, and attended Oakland Technical High School.

College career
Hardy was a two year starter at end for the San Jose State Spartans. As a senior, he tied for the team lead with 13 receptions and was awarded the Mr. Downfield Award as the team's best downfield blocker. He was inducted into the school's Hall of Fame upon graduating.

Professional career
Hardy went unselected in the 1955 NFL Draft and despite several tryouts was not signed by any team initially. He was signed by the San Francisco 49ers in 1958 but was cut during training camp. He was signed by the newly-formed Oakland Raiders and was named a starter going into the team's inaugural season. He finished the year as Oakland's second leading receiver with 24 receptions for 424 yards and three touchdowns. Hardy was cut by the Raiders midway through the 1962 season. Hardy caught 54 passes for 840 yards and seven touchdowns in 33 games in his professional career.

References

1933 births
2001 deaths
Players of American football from Oakland, California
American football ends
San Jose State Spartans football players
Oakland Raiders players